In botany and ecology, graminoid refers to a herbaceous plant with a grass-like morphology, i.e. elongated culms with long, blade-like leaves. They are contrasted to forbs, herbaceous plants without grass-like features.

The plants most often referred to include the families Poaceae (grasses in the strict sense), Cyperaceae (sedges), and Juncaceae (rushes). These are not closely related but belong to different clades in the order Poales. The grasses (Poaceae) are by far the largest family with some 12,000 species.

Besides their similar morphology, graminoids share the widespread occurrence and often dominance in open habitats such as grasslands or marshes. They can however also be found in the understory of forests. Sedges and rushes tend to prefer wetter habitats than grasses.

See also
Reed
Seagrass

References

Plant morphology
Plants by habit
Plant life-forms